General elections were held in Mauritius on 7 August 1967. Ethnic violence broke out in Port Louis between Muslims who were opposed against Creoles and Chinese. Anti-riot police used tear gas to restore peace.

The result was a victory for the Independence Party, an alliance of the Labour Party, Independent Forward Bloc and Comité d'Action Musulman, won 43 of the 70 seats, allowing Labour leader and incumbent Prime Minister Seewoosagur Ramgoolam to form a government.

The voting system created twenty constituencies on Mauritius, which each elected three members. Two seats were elected by residents of Rodrigues, and eight seats were filled by a system known as "best losers" whereby the electoral commission would appoint eight unsuccessful candidates to ensure that ethnic minorities were fairly represented. Voter turnout was 88.9%.

Results

The Independence Party consisted of the Labour Party (26 seats), the Independent Forward Bloc (12 seats) and the Muslim Committee of Action (5 seats).

References

Elections in Mauritius
1967 in Mauritius
Mauritius
Election and referendum articles with incomplete results